Robinson Singh, (born 3 February 1997), also known as Robinson Singh Khumukcham, Robinson Khumukcham, or Robinson Khumukcham Singh, is an Indian professional footballer who plays as a midfielder for TRAU FC.

Career

Early career
Born in Kakching, Manipur, Singh started his career representing his state at the youth levels before being selected for the AIFF Elite Academy. He played for the academy in the I-League youth leagues.

Mohun Bagan
On 22 July 2015 it was announced that Singh had started a trial with the reigning I-League champions, Mohun Bagan. He was successful in his trial and in August 2015 he was registered to play for the club. He made his debut for the club against Kalighat MS during the Calcutta Football League.

Singh made his professional debut for Mohun Bagan on 23 April 2016 against Bengaluru FC. He came on as an 87th minute substitute for Bikramjit Singh as Mohun Bagan won 5–0.

Bengaluru FC
On 31 July 2017 Robinson signed two year contract with Bengaluru FC.

TRAU FC
On 1 August 2019 he joined TRAU FC.

International
Singh has represented India at the under-19 and under-16 levels.

Career statistics

References

1997 births
Living people
People from Thoubal district
Indian footballers
Bengaluru FC players
Association football midfielders
Footballers from Manipur
I-League players
India youth international footballers
Aryan FC players